Miroslav Grigorov (born 16 January 1982) is a Bulgarian footballer, who currently plays as a goalkeeper for Slivnishki Geroy.

External links 
 
 

1982 births
Living people
Bulgarian footballers
First Professional Football League (Bulgaria) players
PFC Kaliakra Kavarna players
PFC Ludogorets Razgrad players
PFC Svetkavitsa players
PFC Vidima-Rakovski Sevlievo players
FC Vereya players
Association football goalkeepers